Solid Gold 70 is the fortieth studio album by American guitarist Chet Atkins, released in 1970. The cover and track listing of this album are identical to the Solid Gold 69 album. Solid Gold 70 was issued in England, after being issued in the US. England did not issue the Solid Gold 68 album, but evidently decided to issue the '69 issue in 1970, changing the '69 to '70.

The liner notes were written by Donovan.

Track listing

Side one
 "Both Sides Now" (Joni Mitchell)
 "Son of a Preacher Man" (John Hurley, Ronnie Wilkins)
 "My Way" (Paul Anka)
 "Blackbird" (Lennon–McCartney)
 "I'll Never Fall in Love Again" (Burt Bacharach, Hal David)
 "So What's New?" (Lee, Pisano)

Side two
 "Folsom Prison Blues" (Johnny Cash)
 "Jean"
 "Love Theme from Romeo and Juliet"
 "Hey Jude" (Lennon–McCartney)
 "Aquarius" (Galt MacDermot, James Rado, Gerome Ragni)

Personnel
Chet Atkins – guitar

Production notes
Produced by Bob Ferguson
Cover Photo by Howard Cooper
Liner Photo by Bill Grine
Sculptor:  Marvin Thompson

References

1970 albums
Chet Atkins albums
Albums produced by Bob Ferguson (music)
RCA Victor albums